TGH may stand for:
 Tampa General Hospital, Florida, US
 Textainer Group Holdings, Bermuda, NYSE symbol
 Toronto General Hospital
 the IATA airport code for Tongoa Airport, Vanuatu
 the ISO 639-3 language code for Tobagonian Creole